Corvides is a clade of birds in the order of Passeriformes. Previously referred to as the core Corvoidea, the evolutionary history and biogeography, behavior and eco-morphology of Corvides has been extensively studied. Corvides appear to represent an island radiation, which colonized all continents except Antarctica.

Systematics
Corvides contains the following families:

 Aegithinidae
 Artamidae
 Dicruridae
 Eulacestomatidae 
 Ifritidae
 Paradisaeidae 
 Corcoracidae
 Laniidae 
 Platylophidae
 Corvidae
 Campephagidae
 Cinclosomatidae
 Eulacestomatidae
 Falcunculidae
 Machaerirhynchidae
 Malaconotoidea
 Melampittidae 
 Mohouidae
 Monarchidae
 Neosittidae
 Oreoicidae
 Oriolidae
 Pachycephalidae
 Paramythiidae
 Pityriaseidae
 Platysteiridae
 Prionopidae
 Psophodidae
 Rhagologidae
 Rhipiduridae 
 Vangidae
 Vireonidae

References

Passeri
Tetrapod unranked clades